Ölgii is a sum (district) of Uvs Province in western Mongolia.

Populated places in Mongolia
Districts of Uvs Province